Miriam  Berger (née Bayfield) is a British Reform rabbi, and Senior Rabbi of Finchley Reform Synagogue in London.

Berger grew up in London, the younger daughter of Rabbi Tony Bayfield, former chief executive and, later, president of the Movement for Reform Judaism and his wife, Linda (who died in 2003). She has a brother, Daniel, and an elder sister, Lucy.

She took a degree at the University of Bristol and studied at Hebrew Union College in Jerusalem before training for the rabbinate at Leo Baeck College in London. She was ordained as a rabbi in 2006.

In April 2020, during the COVID-19 pandemic, she criticised Britain's Health Secretary, Matt Hancock, for allowing relatives of people dying from COVID-19 to visit them in hospital and attend their funerals.

She and her husband Jonni, a tax consultant, and their son live in north London.

References

External links
Rabbi Berger's sermons at Finchley Reform Synagogue

Living people
21st-century English rabbis
Alumni of Leo Baeck College
Alumni of the University of Bristol
British Reform rabbis
English rabbis
Hebrew Union College – Jewish Institute of Religion alumni
Rabbis from London
Reform women rabbis
Year of birth missing (living people)